Jonsun and Gonsun, or colloquially as Jonson and Gonson, is a 2001 Sri Lankan Sinhalese romantic thriller film directed by Roy de Silva. It stars Ranjan Ramanayake, Tennyson Cooray, and Sangeetha Weeraratne in lead roles along with Gemunu Wijesuriya, Jayantha Bopearachchi and Sunil Hettiarachchi. Music composed by Somapala Rathnayake. It is the 959th Sri Lankan film in the Sinhalese cinema.

Plot

Cast
 Ranjan Ramanayake as Sanjay Ranasinghe
 Tennyson Cooray as Jonson
 Sangeetha Weeraratne as Rathnayake Mudiyanselage Dingiri Menika and Inspector Durga
 Gemunu Wijesuriya as Rathnayake Mudiyanse 'Ralahamy'
 Sumana Amarasinghe as Mrs. Ranasinghe
 Sunil Hettiarachchi as Awatheva
 Jayantha Bopearachchi as Ranjuka de Silva
 Ruwanthi Mangala as Kumari
 Mangala Premaratne as Heen Banda
 Ronnie Leitch as Thatta Sira
 Sandeepa Sewmini as Thatta Sira girlfriend
 Upali Keerthisena as Mr. Pusari
 Roy de Silva as Station Master
 Shiromi Priyadarshani as Station Master's wife

Soundtrack

References

2001 films
2000s Sinhala-language films